The Uptown Broadway Building is a historic three-story building at 4703–4715 North Broadway in Uptown, Chicago. Built in 1926, it was designed by Walter W. Ahlschlager and is known for its ornate terra-cotta facade, depicting ancient gods, rams' heads, shields, helmets, birds, fruits, and trophies.  Lynn Becker of the Chicago Reader has called the exterior "a riotous, Spanish-baroque-inspired hallucination". According to unconfirmed local legends, Al Capone operated a speakeasy in the building's basement.

The building was listed on the National Register of Historic Places in 1986. It is also listed as part of the Uptown Square Historic District.

On December 31, 2013, the Kiss Kiss Cabaret announced they have chosen it for their new location.

See also

 National Register of Historic Places listings in North Side Chicago

References

External links

Commercial buildings completed in 1926
Commercial buildings on the National Register of Historic Places in Chicago
1926 establishments in Illinois